Stephen C. Miller (August 26, 1943) is a former American football player, coach of football, basketball, and baseball, and college athletics administrator. He served as the head football coach at Carroll College—now known as Carroll University—in Waukesha, Wisconsin from 1972 to 1976, Morningside College in Sioux City, Iowa from 1977 to 1979, and Cornell College in Mount Vernon, Iowa from 1987 to 2001, compiling a career college football record of 121–94–2. Miller was also the head basketball coach at Cornell during the 1982–83 season and again from 1984 to 1988, tallying a mark of 49–61. He was named NCAA Division III coach of the year while coaching football at Cornell.

Playing career
Miller played quarterback at Cornell College from 1961 until 1964 and was awarded all-conference his senior year.

Coaching career

Carroll
Miller's first head coaching position was as the 23rd head football coach a Carroll College in Waukesha, Wisconsin and he held that position for five seasons, from 1972 until 1976. His career coaching record at Carroll College was 30–15–1.

Morningside
After coaching at Carroll, Miller became head football coach for the Morningside College in Sioux City, Iowa. He held that position for three seasons, from 1977 until 1979. His coaching record at Morningside was 4–24–1.

Cornell
Miller moved to Cornell College, in Mount Vernon, Iowa, in 1980 to work as an assistant football coach under Jerry Clark. He succeeded Clark as head football coach in 1987 and served in that capacity until 2001, when he was replaced by Ray Reasland. While at Cornell, he was awarded Division III Coach of the Year, served twice as the school's athletic director, and was head coach of six sports at the school, including basketball. Miller's football teams compiled a record of 87–55, including an undefeated 10–0 season in 1992.

Later life
As of 2009, Miller still works with Cornell in the alumni office as the Associate Director of Development, Major & Planned Gifts.

Head coaching record

Football

References

1943 births
Living people
American football quarterbacks
Basketball coaches from Iowa
Carroll Pioneers football coaches
Cornell Rams athletic directors
Cornell Rams baseball coaches
Cornell Rams football coaches
Cornell Rams football players
Cornell Rams men's basketball coaches
Morningside Mustangs football coaches
People from Jefferson, Iowa